Meadville may refer to:

 Meadville, Mississippi
 Meadville, Missouri
 Meadville, Nebraska
 Meadville, Pennsylvania, the largest U.S. city named Meadville
 Meadville Area Senior High School
 Meadville Medical Center
 Meadville (album), by David Thomas and Two Pale Boys
 Meadville Corporation, an oil company
 Meadville Lombard Theological School, a Unitarian Universalist seminary in Chicago